Cardography (1987) is a short story collection by American writer Orson Scott Card.  It contains five stories and an introduction by David G. Hartwell. All five of these stories were later published in Maps in a Mirror.

Story list 
The short stories in this book are:

"The Bully and the Beast"
"Middle Woman"
"The Porcelain Salamander"
"The Princess and the Bear"
"Sandmagic"

See also

List of works by Orson Scott Card
Orson Scott Card

External links
 Publication information for Cardography available from Card’s website

1987 short story collections
Short story collections by Orson Scott Card
Fantasy short story collections